Emilio Casalini (born 5 November 1941) is an Italian racing cyclist. He won stage 10 of the 1968 Giro d'Italia.

References

External links
 

1941 births
Living people
Italian male cyclists
Italian Giro d'Italia stage winners
Place of birth missing (living people)
Sportspeople from Parma
Cyclists from Emilia-Romagna